is a railway station on the Hakodate Main Line and South Hokkaido Railway Line in Hakodate, Hokkaido, Japan, operated by Hokkaido Railway Company (JR Hokkaido) and South Hokkaido Railway Company. The station is named after Goryōkaku fort, located about two kilometers from the station.

Lines
Goryōkaku Station is served by the Hakodate Main Line and the South Hokkaido Railway Line.

Station layout

The station has two island platforms serving four tracks.

Platforms

Adjacent stations

History

The station opened as a new station on the Hakodate Main Line on September 1, 1911. It became the terminus of the Esashi Line on September 15, 1913. With the privatization of JNR on April 1, 1987, the station came under the control of JR Hokkaido. The freight terminal was renamed Hakodate Freight Terminal on March 12, 2011.

Surrounding area
 operated by Japan Freight Railway Company (JR Freight) is located next to the passenger station and was previously called Goryōkaku until it was renamed on March 12, 2011.

 Goryōkaku fort
 Goryōkaku-Ekimae Post office

See also
 List of railway stations in Japan

References

Railway stations in Hakodate
Tsugaru-Kaikyō Line
Railway stations in Japan opened in 1911
Stations of Hokkaido Railway Company